is a passenger railway station on the Jōban Line in Mito, Ibaraki, Japan, operated by the East Japan Railway Company (JR East).

It is a "seasonal" station which serves the nearby Kairaku-en gardens, and is open only during the plum blossom season in February and March. Some Hitachi and Tokiwa limited express services also stop at the station during this period.

Lines
Kairakuen Station is served by the Jōban Line from Ueno Station in Tokyo.

Station layout
The station consists of a single side platform serving the down (Mito-bound) track only. Up (Ueno-bound) trains do not stop at this station.

Platforms

History
On 1 February 1967, it was renamed Kairakuen Station. From 1 April 1987, it became a seasonal station.

Surrounding area
 Kairaku-en gardens
 Ibaraki Prefectural Museum of History
 Tokiwa Jinja shrine

See also
 List of railway stations in Japan

References

External links

 Kairakuen Station information (JR East) 

Railway stations in Ibaraki Prefecture
Jōban Line
Mito, Ibaraki
Railway stations in Japan opened in 1925